Bux's Place in Challis, Idaho was listed on the National Register of Historic Places in 1980.

It is a two-story log building which is significant as the only one known to be log and surviving of commercial buildings on Main Avenue in Challis in the 1880s.

In 1980, the building had a neon sign reading "Bux's Place".  Its front lower fenestration dated from the 1930s.

References

National Register of Historic Places in Custer County, Idaho
Buildings and structures completed in 1885
Log buildings and structures on the National Register of Historic Places in Idaho